The Mermaid Melody Pichi Pichi Pitch animated television series is based on the shōjo manga of the same name created by Michiko Yokote. The episodes, produced by the animation studios Actas and Synergy Japan, are directed by Yoshitaka Fujimoto, written by Junki Takegami, and features character design by Kazuaki Makida, who based the designs on illustrations by Pink Hanamori. The story basically follows the main character Lucia Nanami, Mermaid Princess of the North Pacific Ocean, searches for and woos Kaito Dōmoto, a boy she rescued seven years before, while at the same time, she and Hanon Hōshō and Rina Tōin, Princesses of the South and North Atlantic Ocean respectively, battle minion sea monsters using their voices and some magic microphones.

ADV Films acquired the license to the anime in June 2004 for its North American release, but was eventually dropped due to difficulty in finding backers and securing a TV airing deal. While the acquisition of the license and English localization of anime predated that of the manga, it is unknown if a release will occur. That is because as of 2009, the anime has been completely dubbed but is being held by TV Aichi.

The anime is composed of 91 episodes, divided into two seasons listed below.

The anime also uses six theme songs, as well as several mermaid battle and image songs and tunes sung by other characters. Most of them were compiled into a total of nine singles and four "vocal collection" albums (two for each season), as well as soundtrack albums for the two seasons.

Episode list

Mermaid Melody Pichi Pichi Pitch
The first season, simply known as Mermaid Melody Pichi Pichi Pitch, aired on Japan's TV Tokyo Network (through TV Aichi) between April 5, 2003, and March 27, 2004. It chronicles the basic premise mentioned above and adapts stories from the first twenty chapters of the manga. They were compiled into 14 DVD volumes.

There are four theme songs used in this season. The first opening theme,  by Miyuki Kanbe, and the first ending theme  by Asumi Nakata, are used in the first 28 episodes.

Mermaid Melody Pichi Pichi Pitch Pure
The second season, known as Mermaid Melody Pichi Pichi Pitch Pure, aired in Japan's TV Tokyo Network (through TV Aichi) between April 3 to December 25, 2004. Unlike the first season, Pure was compiled into two DVD box sets containing a total of 11 discs. Adapting stories from chapter 21 to 30 of the manga, this season chronicles Lucia's struggles and worries as she faces a new foe and his own minions.

This season differed strongly from the first, mainly in the quality of animation, especially in the last few episodes. They also reused stock footage. The secondary trio became a source of comic relief rather than plot complications, and the series' new "twist" was that all the new villains had image songs. Finally, the themes differed in that the series focused more on the trials of losing love, losing heart (literally and figuratively), and good decisions for one person always hurting another. While the first season was loosely based on the first half of Hans Christian Andersen's The Little Mermaid, this season was inspired by the second half, introducing a character named Michal  who filled the role of Lucia's rival.

There are only two pieces of theme music used in this season. The opening theme is "Before the Moment" by Eri Kitamura while  by Nakata, Terakado, and Asano is the ending song.

References

External links
 

Episodes
Mermaid Melody Pichi Pichi Pitch